Michael C. Neale (born 10 March 1958) is a British behavior geneticist and professor at the Virginia Institute for Psychiatric and Behavioral Genetics at Virginia Commonwealth University. He is known for his research in the field of psychiatric genetics, which aims to determine the roles of genetic and environmental factors in psychiatric disorders and substance abuse. He is estimated to have mentored over 2,000 students in his field. He was president of the Behavior Genetics Association from 2009 to 2010.

References

External links

Faculty profile at VIPBG website

1958 births
Alumni of the University of London
Virginia Commonwealth University faculty
Behavior geneticists
British emigrants to the United States
British geneticists
Genetic epidemiologists
Living people
People from Amersham